Endless Space 2 is a turn-based strategy, science fiction 4X game developed by Amplitude Studios. It is the sequel to Endless Space, which was released in 2012. The game had been made available through Steam's early access program since October 2016. It was released on May 18, 2017, and received positive reviews.

Overview

Endless Space 2 is set in a universe that was long ago dominated by a powerful race called the Endless. Inquisitive and dedicated, the Endless were able to make great advances in the fields of science, which culminated in them achieving virtualization, allowing them to upload their minds into machines and giving them eternal life. This created a great schism in their society, splitting it into two opposing factions, the Virtuals, who embraced electronic immortality, and the Concretes, who viewed it as an abomination. The quarrels quickly grew into an open war, called the Dust Wars, which essentially destroyed their society, leaving but a few splintered surviving individuals.
Tens of thousands of years after the demise of the Endless, the galaxy is yet again thriving with life capable of interstellar travel, picking at the remains of the once great Endless empire. The player takes control of one of the 12 major factions, "each with their own asymmetrical gameplay, storyline, homeworlds, spaceships, heroes and technologies".
The Sophons are a peaceful and curious race which evolved from a Gecko like species. They pursue scientific advancement as a constant goal, often to the point of recklessness, having once blown up their own moon. For Sophons, the universe and life are something to be looked at with awe and to be studied and understood. The Sophons have a unique ability to gain a research bonus to the technology that they are researching proportional to the number of factions that haven't yet researched the chosen technology.
The Cravers are an aggressive hive-like half-machine half-insect race created by the virtual Endless who used them as a weapon against the Concrete Endless. The Cravers are always at war with other factions and are incapable of signing peace unless the Militaristic party has no representation in their senate. The Cravers gain 150% bonus to FIDS resources (Food, Industry, Dust and Science), but slowly deplete the planets that they inhabit, turning them unproductive and reducing their FIDS output to 50% after a certain time. They are also able to enslave other populations, increasing their FIDS output, but reducing their Approval (happiness).
The Lumeris are an amphibian race that focuses on trading and dust acquisition (dust is the collection of nanobots and nano-computers created by the Endless and used as the currency by today's factions who lack the ability to understand it and manipulate it). The Lumeris are able to colonize new systems using dust (instead of with colonizing ships) and gain bonuses to trade companies as well as reduction to dust inflation, which allows them to more efficiently buy out system improvements and spaceships with dust.
The Vodyani developed on a poor planet called Tchinomy. Due to overexploitation of their home planet's resources they almost went extinct, but were saved by stumbling upon the technology of the Virtual Endless, causing them to worship them as gods. The Vodyani society is based on a religious hierarchy and they seek to convert other civilizations into Vodyani, drawing their lifeforce (by a unique resource called essence) and helping them ascend past their physical forms into virtuals. The Vodyani don't inhabit planets but instead live on their arks and exploit all the planets that their arks orbit around, allowing them to easily move to a new system that is richer in resources.
The United Empire is an expansionist multiethnic faction ruled by an emperor. Their gameplay is focused on industrial output, which generates influence, which can be used to buy out system improvements, technologies and resources. The Imperials have a very flexible endgame, since they are later able to change their culture into Sheredyn (who have militaristic bonuses) or Mezari (who possess scientific bonus), making them well-suited for several victory types.
The Horatio were founded by an eccentric Mezari magnate who got hold of ancient cloning labs used by the Endless, exploiting them to create a massive army of clones, replicating the most beautiful being in the galaxy – himself. The Horatio society views other races as inferior and primitive, and seeks to 'beautify' the galaxy, making it contain nothing but copies of Horatio. The faction possesses a unique ability to harvest other populations’ traits, splicing their genes and adding them to their own, constantly improving FIDSI (FIDS plus Influence) output of the Horatio population.
The Riftborn, odd-looking white floating beings from an alternate dimension were driven from their original universe called Coroz into the Endless universe when a dust artifact on board a Hissho vessel exploded, causing a rift between the two universes. The different and incompatible physical laws of the two universes caused the rift to grow and to consume Coroz and its inhabitants and forced the Riftborn out of their own world. The Riftborn prefer sterile planets instead of fertile ones and do not increase their numbers by food (the Riftborn population must be constructed with industry). They are also able to place powerful singularities (time manipulations) on systems which can modify both friendly and enemy system FIDSI output.
The Unfallen are a peaceful race of sentient trees that developed on the forest world of Koyasil. They are one of the oldest races in the universe and they possess the ability to discover and awake Guardians on planets, a special type of population which provides defensive bonuses to the planet it inhabits. The Unfallen colonize and claim other systems using celestial vines (which are special links between systems) and do not rely on spreading influence, like other empires. Additionally, they gain approval bonuses during peacetime and per factions they are allied to.
The Vaulters (added in the Vaulters DLC) are the descendants of a Mezari penal ship which crashed on the world of Auriga, where they set up a colony (during the events of the Endless Legend game). After a cataclysmic atmospheric event, they were forced to flee the planet and have since wandered the galaxy in search of a new home.

Gameplay 
At the beginning of the game, the player can choose from one of the 12 predesigned factions, as well as create their own custom faction. They are then given control of a fledgling empire, which they must expand by conquering systems. Each system has up to 5 planets, with their own environments, climates, stats (i.e. production, food, etc.), and sometimes anomalies. Anomalies can be explored using an explorer ship, and give buffs or debuffs to the entire system. Planet stats determine how effective planets are at what, while environments determine whether a planet is colonizable or not. The ability to colonize different environments is unlocked through research. Each planet can also be given a specialization, which give buffs, with additional buffs being granted based on climate. Finally, the player can construct improvements to a system's infrastructure, with several powerful variants that can only be built once in the entire game. Players can explore and colonise systems utilizing ships, though initially restricted to star lanes, the player can unlock several other forms of travel via research.

Research is key to progressing through the game. It unlocks new constructions, ship hulls, weapons, modules, upgrades, tactics, system infrastructure, abilities and other items to give the player an advantage. The game has currently 10 factions (including the downloadable content). There are four different categories of research trees: military, science and technology, business and trade, and empire development. Each tree has five levels, which are only unlockable by researching different subjects in the level before. Politics are also important for different reasons. The game features a political system, which each faction has a certain affinity for, industrialists, scientists, militarists, pacifists, ecologists, and religious. All of which provide laws to provide buffs to the player, as well as one automatic law being enacted by the main party in power, becoming more potent over time from, established to entrenched. There are also different types of government, which can augment law effectiveness and how many parties can be in office at once. Increasing party support can be achieved by reaching certain technologies, building appropriate infrastructure, and performing certain actions (declaring war, building bunkers, and researching weapons increasing militarist party support being a good example).

In order to expand their empire, the player must colonize systems throughout their galaxy. They are also competing with various other empires, who are also attempting to win the game. The player can interact with them, by declaring war, sending tributes, or forming alliances. Each empire has their own territory, and different relationships with the player (i.e. Cold War, War, Wary, etc.). There are also minor civilizations, with whom players can improve their relationships to get them to send resources, or on whom they can declare war. They can also be assimilated into the player's empire if their relationship is good enough. However, opposing empires can interact with these civilizations as well.

To fight against other empires, players require ships and ground troops. Players can engage in ship to ship battles against enemy fleets, with battles playing out automatically, fleets are pitted against each other with their relative effectiveness being determined by weapon and defense modules, the range of engagement being determined by the strategy card a player picks. Different battle tactics can be used, which give bonuses and change the range of engagement. Players can also retreat from battle, saving their ships at the cost of taking some damage. Players can also invade by sending their ground troops to fight against defenders for a system. The player's ground troops can be upgraded, and the player can decide what percentages of the army they make up. Replenishing ground troops requires manpower, a special resource, and each ship can only carry so many soldiers. Players can also weaken an enemy system's defenders by placing their fleets in orbit and besieging the enemy system, which decreases the number of enemy troops.

The player can design ships. There are three classes of ship hulls: small, medium, and large, which are unlocked as the player climbs the appropriate research tree. Larger hulls have more health, manpower capacity, and module slots, but require more resources and time to build, and take up more space in a fleet. Each ship has support and weapon modules, where players can equip certain weapons and buff-granting support modules. Each weapon has different stats and ranges. There are three ranges: short, medium, and long. Each weapon has a certain accuracy at certain ranges, with poor accuracy resulting many missed shots, lowering damage. Certain weapons have special properties; for example, kinetic weapons, while ineffective at long range, can attack incoming missiles, fighters, and bombers. Beam weapons, on the other hand, have relatively low damage output but are unaffected by range, making them incredibly consistent.

Development
The game was made available through Steam's early access program on 6 October 2016. The full game was released on the 19 May 2017.

The game received its third major update on 23 March 2018. It added the Vaulter civilization, pirate bases, and an Early Access version of multiplayer mode along with several new visual elements.

Downloadable content 
Since the release of the game, many DLCs have been added. Six updates, made available via a DLC format, were given to all players for free.

 Stories
 Vaulters (Faction pack)
 Lost Symphony
 Untold tales
 Supremacy (one new Faction and gameplay changes)
 Penumbra (one new Faction and new game features, in addition the ability to hack others)
 Awakening (one new Faction and the academy as an NPC faction)

Reception

Accolades

References

External links
 

2017 video games
4X video games
Early access video games
Iceberg Interactive games
Science fiction video games
Sega video games
Space opera video games
Turn-based strategy video games
Video games developed in France
Windows games
MacOS games
Multiplayer and single-player video games
Artificial wormholes in fiction
Video game sequels
Amplitude Studios games